Lincoln Township is a township in Shelby County, Iowa. There are 592 people and 17.6 people per square mile in Lincoln Township. The total area is 33.6 square miles.

References

Townships in Shelby County, Iowa
Townships in Iowa